The University of Piteşti (abbreviated UPIT) is a public university in Piteşti, Romania, founded in 1991.

History
The first Higher Education Institution in Piteşti was founded in 1962 and was called "The 3-year Pedagogical Institute" with pedagogical specialisations in Mathematics, Physics, Biology, Chemistry, Philology and Physical Education and Sports. The opening of the technical specialisations followed, leading to the establishment of the Institute of Sub-Engineers (1969), united in 1974 under the name of the Institute of Higher Education. Subsequently, there were various other forms of organisation, in a period under the subordination of the Bucharest Polytechnic Institute. In 1991, it became autonomous and received the name "University of Pitești".
Starting from the beginning, the University of Pitești has polarised the interest of many young people in the region for the programs of study, quality of the education provided by the academic staff, but also for the students from all over the world, since Pitești is renowned for the largest Romanian Language Training Center for Foreign Students.

Faculties 
University of Pitești is organised into 6 faculties, comprising 16 departments: 
 Faculty of Sciences, Physical Education and Computer Science
 Faculty of Mechanics and Technology
 Faculty of Electronics, Communications and Computers
 Faculty of Education, Social Sciences and Psychology
 Faculty of Economics and Law
 Faculty of Theology, Philology, History and Arts

References

University of Pitești
Universities in Pitești
Educational institutions established in 1991
1991 establishments in Romania